BWDA Polytechnic College is a technical educational institution founded in 2009 in Vendalicode, Kanyakumari District, Tamil Nadu, India.

Diploma courses
Diploma in Mechanical Engineering (Mech)	
Diploma in Electrical and Electronics Engineering (EEE)	
Diploma in Electronics and Communication Engineering (ECE)
Diploma in Computer Engineering (DCE)
Diploma in Civil Engineering (DCE)

References

External links
BWDA College

Private engineering colleges in Tamil Nadu
Universities and colleges in Kanyakumari district
Educational institutions established in 2009
2009 establishments in Tamil Nadu